Aaron Marshall Elliott (January 24, 1844 – November 9, 1910) was an American novelist and professor at Johns Hopkins University. He is considered the founder of the Modern Language Association.

References

1844 births
1910 deaths
People from Baltimore
Johns Hopkins University faculty
Presidents of the Modern Language Association